Clavilispinus rufescens is a species of unmargined rove beetle in the family Staphylinidae. It is found in North America.

References

Further reading

 
 

Osoriinae
Articles created by Qbugbot
Beetles described in 1957